Guillermo Alberto González Mosquera (12 February 1941 – 5 August 2021) was a Colombian politician who served as a Minister, Governor of Cauca, Senator and Mayor of Popayán.

References

1941 births
2021 deaths
People from Popayán
Colombian politicians
Colombian governors
Colombian Liberal Party politicians
Government ministers of Colombia
Members of the Senate of Colombia
Mayors of places in Colombia
University of Cauca alumni
Purdue University alumni
Academic staff of the University of Cauca